Joseph Michael Gleeson (1861 – September 26, 1917) was an American painter and illustrator. He is responsible for the only painting from life of a thylacine and her cubs, from the National Zoo's specimens in 1902. He co-illustrated one of the earliest American editions of Just So Stories by Rudyard Kipling. Some of his work is now considered paleoart.

Gleeson died on September 26, 1917, in Ashburn, Virginia.

References

External links

 
 
 Just So Stories, with Gleeson illustrations, at Project Gutenberg
 Gleeson illustrations for Just So Stories at Wikimedia Commons
 

1861 births
1917 deaths
American illustrators
Paleoartists
People from Ashburn, Virginia